Syahroni (born 10 August 1992) is an Indonesian professional footballer who plays as a midfielder for Liga 2 club PSKC Cimahi.

Club career

Mitra Kukar
In 2019, Syahroni signed a contract with Indonesian Liga 2 club Mitra Kukar.

Persis Solo
He was signed for Persis Solo to play in Liga 2 in the 2020 season. This season was suspended on 27 March 2020 due to the COVID-19 pandemic. The season was abandoned and was declared void on 20 January 2021.

Persela Lamongan
He was signed for Persela Lamongan to play in Liga 1 in the 2021 season. Syahroni made his debut on 4 September 2021 in a match against PSIS Semarang at the Wibawa Mukti Stadium, Cikarang.

PSS Sleman
In 2022, Syahroni signed a contract with Indonesian Liga 1 club PSS Sleman. He made his debut on 7 January 2022 in a 4–1 win against Persiraja Banda Aceh as a substitute for Misbakus Solikin in the 65th minute at the Ngurah Rai Stadium, Denpasar.

Honours

Club 
Persibo Bojonegoro
 Piala Indonesia: 2012

International 
Indonesia U-23
 Islamic Solidarity Games  Silver medal: 2013

References

External links
 Syahroni at Soccerway
 Syahroni at Liga Indonesia

1992 births
Living people
People from Tangerang
Sportspeople from Banten
Indonesian footballers
Association football midfielders
Indonesian Premier League players
Persibo Bojonegoro players
PS Barito Putera players
Persija Jakarta players
Persela Lamongan players